The Central Statistics Office (CSO) is a governmental agency in India under the Ministry of Statistics and Programme Implementation responsible for co-ordination of statistical activities in India, and evolving and maintaining statistical standards. It has a Graphical Unit.  The CSO is located in Delhi. Some portion of Industrial Statistics work pertaining to Annual Survey of industries is carried out in Calcutta. It deals with statistical data of different departments.

Activities
The Central Statistics Office is responsible for co-ordination of statistical activities in the country, and evolving and maintaining statistical standards. Its activities include National Income Accounting; conduct of Annual Survey of Industries, Economic Censuses and its follow up surveys, compilation of Index of Industrial Production, as well as Consumer Price Indices for Urban Non-Manual Employees, Human Development Statistics, Gender Statistics, imparting training in Official Statistics, Five Year Plan work relating to Development of Statistics in the States and Union Territories; dissemination of statistical information, work relating to trade, energy, construction, and environment statistics, revision of National Industrial Classification, etc.
It has two publications :
1. the statistical abstract- InIndia (annual)
2. the monthly abstract of Statistics

Organisation
The CSO is headed by the Director-General who is assisted by Five additional Director-Generals and four Deputy Director-Generals, six Joint Directors, seven special task officers, thirty deputy directors, 48 assistant directors and other supporting staff. The CSO is located in Delhi.

Functions
The Central Statistics Office (CSO) in the Ministry of Statistics and Programme Implementation (MoS & PI) is responsible for the compilation of National Accounts Statistics (NAS). At the State level, State Directorates of Economy and Statistics (DESs) have the responsibility of compiling their State Domestic Product and other aggregates.
It plays an advisory role in statistical matters
It provides national statistics to UN
It has set up a unit to attend to statistical work relating to the five-year plans in collaboration with the planning commission and has expanded training facilities for statistics personnel.
It is also responsible for the compilation and publication of national income statistics.
The CSO through its Industrial Statistical wing conducts the Annual Survey of Industries and publishes the result.

History
The CSO was set up in the cabinet secretariat on 2 May 1951 as a part of the cabinet Secretariat and having co-ordinating and advisory functions. At that time the name of CSO was Central Statistical Institute. In 1954 the CSI merged with CSO and the new name was Central Statistical Organization. Recently, for a third time its name changed and now it called as Central Statistics Office.

See also
List of national and international statistical services

References

External links
 

India
Statistical organisations in India
Executive branch of the government of India
Industry in India